Sharon Hill station  is a SEPTA Regional Rail station in Sharon Hill, Pennsylvania. It serves the Wilmington/Newark Line, with southbound service to Wilmington and Newark, Delaware and northbound service to Philadelphia. This station is within walking distance of the Sharon Hill terminus of the Route 102 Trolley, although no direct connection exists between the two stations. It is not a staffed station and has no ticket machines. The historic station building, which was originally built in 1872, is abandoned and is to be restored. It is located at Sharon & Woodland Avenues. Amtrak trains pass through but do not stop.

Station layout
Sharon Hill has two low-level side platforms with walkways connecting passengers to the inner tracks. Amtrak's Northeast Corridor lines bypass the station via the inner tracks.

References

External links
SEPTA - Sharon Hill Station
Historic Sharon Hill PRR Station photos
 Station House from Google Maps Street View

SEPTA Regional Rail stations
Stations on the Northeast Corridor
Railway stations in the United States opened in 1872
Railway stations in Delaware County, Pennsylvania
Former Pennsylvania Railroad stations
Wilmington/Newark Line